Skyfame Center Landmark Tower is a supertall skyscraper on-hold in Skyfame Center, Nanning, Guangxi, China.

See also
 List of tallest buildings in China

References

Skyscrapers in Nanning
Skyscraper office buildings in China
Residential skyscrapers in China